The Heart of England Way is a long-distance walk of around  through the Midlands of England. The walk starts from Milford Common on Cannock Chase and ends at Bourton on the Water in the Cotswolds linking south Staffordshire through Warwickshire to east Gloucestershire (or vice versa).

It crosses seven others: the Beacon Way, Staffordshire Way, Two Saints Way, Arden Way, Cotswold Way, Oxfordshire Way, and Thames Path. It is maintained by the Heart of England Way Association.

On 3 April 2021, Richard Antrobus set a new record, north to south, nonstop of 19 hours 47 minutes. Food and water was provided at prearranged places to comply with Covid restrictions in place at the time. Diversions due to construction of HS2 were followed with the final distance covered being 104 miles. This was confirmed by two separate trackers carried for the entire route.

On 20 July 2013, Ultra Runner David Hollyoak set a solo course record of completing the entire length of the Heart Of England Way (south to north) nonstop in 25 hours 11 minutes. The run is corroborated by having a relay of runners to run sections with him all the way.

Places on the way
Milford
Cannock Chase
Castle Ring
Lichfield
Drayton Bassett
Shustoke
Meriden
Berkswell
Balsall Common
Rowington
Henley-in-Arden
Alcester
Bidford-on-Avon
Upper Quinton
Mickleton
Chipping Campden
Longborough
Bourton-on-the-Water

Gallery

References

External links
 Heart of England Way
 The Rambler's Association info on the Heart of England Way
 Photos taken along the Heart of England Way on geograph.org.uk

Long-distance footpaths in England
Footpaths in Staffordshire
Footpaths in Warwickshire
Footpaths in Gloucestershire